Blue Piccolo is an album by American trumpeter Ted Curson which was recorded in 1976 and first released on the Japanese Whynot label and the on India Navigation in the US as Ted Curson & Co.

Reception

Allmusic awarded the album 4 stars with its review by Scott Yanow stating, "The distinctive trumpeter Ted Curson is well showcased on this LP... As usual his solos are both adventurous and (due to his appealing tone and roots in earlier styles of jazz) fairly accessible. Worth searching for".

Track listing
All compositions by Ted Curson except as indicated
 "All the Things You Are" (Oscar Hammerstein II, Jerome Kern) - 9:36
 "Blue Piccolo" - 12:29
 "Playhouse March" - 7:09
 "Song of the Lonely" - 8:05 		
 "Dwackdi Mun Fudalick" - 5:31

Personnel
Ted Curson - flugelhorn, trumpet, pocket trumpet 
Jim McNeely - piano
Cecil McBee - bass 
Steve McCall - drums

References

1976 albums
Whynot Records albums
India Navigation albums
Ted Curson albums